A constitutional referendum was held in Egypt on 22 May 1980. The amendments would create the Shura Council, an upper house for the country's Parliament, and were approved by 99% of voters.

Results

References

1980 in Egypt
Referendums in Egypt
Egypt
Constitutional referendums in Egypt
May 1980 events in Africa